Performance and Cocktails: Live at Morfa Stadium is a 1999 DVD released by Welsh Rock trio, Stereophonics. The DVD features live recordings from a concert at Morfa Stadium from 31 July 1999.

Track listing
 Hurry Up and Wait
 The Bartender and the Thief
 T-shirt Sun Tan
 Pick a Part That's New
 A Thousand Trees
 Not Up To You
 Check My Eyelids For Holes
 I Wouldn't Believe Your Radio
 She Takes Her Clothes Off
 Sunny Afternoon
 Is Yesterday, Tomorrow, Today?
 Same Size Feet
 Traffic
 Last of the Big Time Drinkers
 Just Looking
 Looks Like Chaplin
 Local Boy in the Photograph
 Roll Up and Shine
 Nice To Be Out
 Billy Davey's Daughter
 I Stopped To Fill My Car Up

Stereophonics video albums
V2 Records video albums
1999 video albums